Peter Liu may refer to:

Peter Liu Cheng-chung (born 1951), Taiwanese Roman Catholic bishop in Kaohsiung
Peter Liu Gen-zhu (born 1966), Chinese Roman Catholic bishop in Hongdong